The 2017 San Diego Toreros football team represented the University of San Diego during the 2017 NCAA Division I FCS football season. They were led by fifth-year head coach Dale Lindsey and played their home games at Torero Stadium. They were a member of the Pioneer Football League. They finished the season 10–3, 8–0 in PFL play to be crowned Pioneer Football League champions. They received the PFL's automatic bid to the FCS Playoffs where they defeated Northern Arizona in the first round before losing the North Dakota State in the second round for the second consecutive year.

Previous season 
The Toreros finished the 2016 season 10–2, 8–0 in PFL play to win the PFL championship. They earned the conference's automatic bid to the FCS Playoffs, where they defeated Cal Poly in the first round to mark the school's and the PFL's first-ever playoff victory. In the second round, they lost to defending national champion North Dakota State.

Preseason 
In a poll of league coaches, San Diego was picked to win the Pioneer League for the seventh consecutive year.

Schedule

Game summaries

Western New Mexico

at UC Davis

at Princeton

Butler

at Dayton

Morehead State

at Jacksonville

at Stetson

Drake

at Davidson

Marist

FCS Playoffs

at Northern Arizona–First Round

at North Dakota State–Second Round

References

San Diego
San Diego Toreros football seasons
Pioneer Football League champion seasons
San Diego
San Diego Toreros football